So ein Millionär hat's schwer is a 1958 Austrian film directed by Géza von Cziffra.

Cast 
Peter Alexander as Edward Collin
Germaine Damar as Ninette
Heinz Erhardt as Alfons Rappert
Loni Heuser as Madame Sorel
Elga Andersen as Alice Sorel
Erich Fiedler as Hoteldirektor Hercule Blanc
Louis Soldan as Liebhaber Armand
Brigitte Mira as Madame Pillard
Ernst Waldbrunn as Gefängniswärter Raymond
Erich Nikowitz as Butler Jean
Fritz Eckhardt as Wirt Napoleon
Raoul Retzer as Motorradpolizist
Hans Podehl as Schlagzeuger Robert
Armand Ozory as Herzog von Baskerville
Melanie Horeschowsky
Edith Hieronimus
Eva Iro
Traudl Eichinger
Felix Czerny
Hans Hais as Kommissar
Otto Stumvoll
Harry Kratz
Wolfgang Wahl as Marcel Magnol

Soundtrack 
Peter Alexander - "Venga, Venga Musica!" (Music by Heinz Gietz, lyrics by Kurt Feltz)
Peter Alexander - "Er war ein Musikant" (Music by Heinz Gietz, lyrics by Kurt Feltz)
Peter Alexander - "Fabelhaft!" (Music by Heinz Gietz, lyrics by Kurt Feltz)
Peter Alexander - "Hab'n Sie nicht ein schönes großes Faß da?" (Music by Heinz Gietz, lyrics by Kurt Feltz)
Peter Alexander and Heinz Erhardt - "Tun Sie's nicht!" (Music by Heinz Gietz, lyrics by Kurt Feltz)
Peter Alexander and Germaine Damar - "Venga, Venga Musica!" (reprise)

External links 

1958 films
1958 musical comedy films
Austrian musical comedy films
1950s German-language films
Films directed by Géza von Cziffra
Films based on short fiction
Films set on the French Riviera